Isobel is the Scottish variant of Isabel, a feminine given name.  Isobel may also refer to:

 "Isobel" (song), by Icelandic singer Björk from the album Post
 "Isobel" (Dido song), by the British singer Dido from her album No Angel
 Isobel: A Romance of the Northern Trail, 1913 novel by James Oliver Curwood
 Isobel or The Trail's End, a 1920 film by director Edwin Carewe, from the novel by James Oliver Curwood
 "Isobel" (The Vampire Diaries), an episode of the TV series The Vampire Diaries
 a contour line connecting points of equal sound pressure on an isobel map

See also 
 Isabel (disambiguation)
 Cyclone Isobel (disambiguation), four cyclones in the southern hemisphere